Anthony Alabi (born February 16, 1981) is an American actor and former American football offensive tackle. He was drafted by the Miami Dolphins in the fifth round of the 2005 NFL Draft. He played college football at Texas Christian.

Alabi has also been a member of the Kansas City Chiefs and the Tampa Bay Buccaneers.

Since 2010, Alabi has been acting. His most recent role is in the Netflix series Family Reunion.

Early years
Alabi attended Antonian College Preparatory High School in San Antonio, where he was a four-year letterman in football, and also lettered in basketball and track and field (shot put and discus). He earned all-district and all-state honors in football and led the team in sacks (13) and tackles (82) as a senior.  He was a two-time state champion in track. Alabi was inducted in the 2013-14 Antonian Athletics Hall of Fame class.

College career
Alabi attended the United States Naval Academy for a short time in 1999 before heading to  Texas Christian University (TCU), where he was a four-year letterman, starting his final three seasons and making 35 career starts in college. He was a defensive lineman before moving to the offensive line during his redshirt season in 2000. He started all 12 games at left tackle as a sophomore, as TCU led the Conference USA by averaging 203.2 yards rushing per outing. As a junior, he was part of a line that paved the way for an offense that averaged more than 200 net rushing yards and 200 net passing yards per game - one of only six Division I schools to accomplish that feat. In his senior season, the offense averaged 32.9 points per game. He earned first-team All-Conference USA accolades each of his final two years, during which time he opened a combined 23 games.

Professional career

Miami Dolphins
Alabi was drafted by the Miami Dolphins in the fifth round (162nd overall) of the 2005 NFL Draft by former head coach Nick Saban. The pick used to select him was acquired from the Kansas City Chiefs in the deal that sent cornerback Patrick Surtain to the Chiefs. On July 22, the Dolphins signed Alabi to a four-year contract that included a signing bonus of $158,000.

Alabi was tried at left tackle during training camp, and shortly after returning to practice from an ankle injury he was shifted to right tackle. He played in a reserve role during the team's five preseason games, and was inactive for all 16 regular season contests. He nursed an elbow injury during November which caused him to miss practice time.

Alabi saw his first regular season action in 2006, playing in six games during the year. He made his NFL debut in a reserve role on October 1 at the Houston Texans. He also saw extensive action on December 17 at the Buffalo Bills following injury to Damion McIntosh.

On February 11, Alabi was one of nine players let go by the Dolphins.

Kansas City Chiefs
On February 13, just two days after being waived by the Dolphins, Alabi was claimed by the Kansas City Chiefs. Alabi was released by the Chiefs on August 30, 2008.

Tampa Bay Buccaneers
After spending the 2008 regular season out of football, Alabi was signed to a reserve/future contract by the Tampa Bay Buccaneers on January 6, 2009.

Alabi was released by the Buccaneers on September 5, 2009.

Acting career
Alabi retired from the NFL in 2009 to pursue a career in acting. He is a series lead in Family Reunion, a Netflix original series also starring Loretta Devine, Tia Mowry, and Richard Roundtree, which released in July 2019. He also has recurring roles in Raven's Home and Bosch as well as guest star roles in Malibu Rescue, Shameless, and Insecure.

Filmography

Television

Video games

Personal life
Alabi's father is from Nigeria and his mother is from Puerto Rico. He is a first cousin of Houston Texans defensive end N. D. Kalu.

He earned a BS degree in criminal justice with a minor in business at  Texas Christian and later, while in the NFL, a Master's in Liberal Arts with a criminology focus.

Alabi is married to Caroline, a Pilates instructor. They have two children.

References

Players of American football from San Antonio
American football offensive tackles
Navy Midshipmen football players
TCU Horned Frogs football players
Miami Dolphins players
Kansas City Chiefs players
1981 births
Living people
American sportspeople of Nigerian descent
American people of Puerto Rican descent